James Glen Taylor (June 27, 1934 – February 25, 2005) was an American football center and linebacker who played college football for Baylor and professional football in the National Football League (NFL) for the Pittsburgh Steelers (1956) and Chicago Cardinals (1957–1958). He also played in the Canadian Football League (CFL) for the Hamilton Tiger-Cats in 1959 and 1960. He appeared in a total of 29 NFL games and 28 CFL games.

Early years
Taylor was born in 1934 in Rowden, Texas, and attended Clyde High School in Clyde, Texas. He then played college football at Baylor.

Professional football
He was drafted by the Pittsburgh Steelers in the third round (29th overall pick) in the 1956 NFL Draft. He appeared in 12 games, nine as a starter, for the 1956 Steelers. He then played for the Chicago Cardinals in 1957 and 1958, appearing in 17 games. 

In August 1959, Taylor signed with the Hamilton Tiger-Cats of the Canadian Football League (CFL). He played for Hamiton in 1959 and 1960, appearing in 28 games. Taylor asked the Tiger Cats in February 1960 to release him so that he could play for Houston in the American Football League, but the Cats refused.

Later years
Taylor died in 2005 at age 70 in Abilene, Texas.

References

1934 births
2005 deaths
American football centers
American football linebackers
Pittsburgh Steelers players
Chicago Cardinals players
Baylor Bears football players
Players of American football from Texas